Awangku Mohammad Syafiq Hilmi bin Pengiran Mohammad Shahrom (born 13 August 2000) is a Bruneian footballer who plays as a midfielder for DPMM FC of the Singapore Premier League.

Club career
At age 11, Syafiq was one of the breakout stars at the Dash Football Academy, the youth academy that his father Shahrom Ismail co-founded. He joined the ranks of DPMM FC's under-16 team in 2019. 

Having caught the eye as the best player at a DPMM FC football festival in 2021, Syafiq trialed for a place in their first team at the start of 2023, as they were preparing for a return to the Singapore Premier League after three years away. He managed to impress head coach Adrian Pennock and was handed the number 15 shirt vacated by Hazwan Hamzah and joined Eddy Shahrol Omar, Hirzi Zulfaqar Mahzan and Nazirrudin Ismail as the new local players of the royalty-owned team for the 2023 Singapore Premier League.

Syafiq made his debut as a substitute for Hanif Farhan Azman in the 86th minute in a 3–1 defeat away to Lion City Sailors on 3 March 2023.

International career
Syafiq was selected for the Brunei under-19 team competing at the 2022 AFF U-19 Youth Championship hosted by Indonesia in July. He played in the final game against the Philippines in a 0–5 loss. He was then drafted into the under-17s for both the 2022 AFF U-16 Youth Championship and the 2023 AFC U-17 Asian Cup qualification games later in the year, playing in every match.

Personal life
Syafiq is the son of Shahrom Ismail, a former footballer for the Brunei representative team in the Malaysian leagues who also played internationally for Brunei in 2003. His uncle, Shahril Ismail was also an international footballer for Brunei.

References

External links

2006 births
Living people
Association football midfielders
Bruneian footballers
DPMM FC players
Singapore Premier League players